The men's 1500 metres event at the 2006 World Junior Championships in Athletics was held in Beijing, China, at Chaoyang Sports Centre on 15 and 17 August.

Medalists

Results

Final
17 August

Heats
15 August

Heat 1

Heat 2

Heat 3

Participation
According to an unofficial count, 34 athletes from 26 countries participated in the event.

References

1500 metres
1500 metres at the World Athletics U20 Championships